Svenska Supercupen 2015, Swedish Super Cup 2015, was the 9th and last Svenska Supercupen, an annual football match contested by the winners of the previous season's Allsvenskan and Svenska Cupen competitions. The match was played on 8 November 2015 at the Nya Parken, Norrköping, between the 2015 Allsvenskan champions, IFK Norrköping, and the 2014–15 Svenska Cupen winners IFK Göteborg. The match was IFK Göteborg's fifth appearance in the competition and their first since 2013. It was the first appearance for IFK Norrköping.

In Sweden the match was broadcast live on TV12. Johan Hamlin from Bro was the referee for match, his first time officiating the competition. IFK Norrköping won the match 3–0, scoring all three goals in the first half. The goal scorers were Alexander Fransson, Christoffer Nyman and Kujović.

Background
IFK Göteborg qualified for Svenska Supercupen on 17 May 2015 when they won the 2015 Svenska Cupen Final against Örebro SK. They won the competition in 2008 and finished as runners-up in 2009, 2010 and in 2013.

The 2015 Allsvenskan champions, IFK Norrköping, qualified on 31 October, in the last round of Allsvenskan, when they secured their first league title in 26 years. This is the first time in Svenska Supercupen for IFK Norrköping, who had the home advantage as league winners, playing at Nya Parken, Norrköping.

Match

Statistics

See also
2015 Allsvenskan
2014–15 Svenska Cupen
2015 IFK Norrköping season
2015 IFK Göteborg season

References

External links
 

Super
2015 Svenska Supercupen
IFK Göteborg matches
November 2015 sports events in Europe
Sports competitions in Norrköping
IFK Norrköping matches